George Oakes (April 21, 1861 – April 19, 1937) was an American lawyer and politician.

Born on a farm near New Richmond, Wisconsin, Oakes received his law degree from University of Minnesota Law School. He then practiced law in New Richmond, Wisconsin. He was the New Richmond city attorney and served on the St. Croix County, Wisconsin Board of Supervisors. Oakes was a Republican. From 1919 until 1923, Oakes served in the Wisconsin State Assembly. Oakes died of heart disease in New Richmond, Wisconsin.

Notes

1861 births
1937 deaths
People from New Richmond, Wisconsin
University of Minnesota Law School alumni
Farmers from Wisconsin
Wisconsin lawyers
County supervisors in Wisconsin
Republican Party members of the Wisconsin State Assembly